Ronald Sanders is a Canadian film editor and television producer.

Career
Sanders won Genie Awards for his work on Eastern Promises (2007), eXistenZ (2000), Crash (1996), and Dead Ringers (1989). He has collaborated extensively with director David Cronenberg; since 1979, he has edited most of Cronenberg's films.

Ronald Sanders is a member of the Canadian Cinema Editors.

Filmography

As editor

Recognition 
 2008 Genie Award for Best Achievement in Editing - Eastern Promises - Won
 2007 Satellite Award for Best Film Editing - Eastern Promises - Nominated
 2006 Directors Guild of Canada DGC Craft Award for Outstanding Picture Editing - Feature Film - A History of Violence - Won
 2006 Online Film Critics Society Awards OFCS Award for Best Editing - A History of Violence - Nominated
 2005 San Diego Film Critics Society Awards SDFCS Award for Best Editing - A History of Violence - Won
 2003 Directors Guild of Canada DGC Team Award for Outstanding Achievement in a Feature Film - Spider - Won (Outstanding Achievement in a Feature Film (shared with David Cronenberg, Marilyn Stonehouse, Walter Gasparovic, Penny Charter, Arvinder Grewal, Jon Hunter, Abbie Weinberg, Barbara Pullan, George Ploszczansky, John Rakich, Anna Beben, John Roy, Sue Sparling, Rachel Clarke, Jody K. MacPherson, Jennifer Cote, Mike Manzato, Lynda McKenzie, Tad Seaborn, David Evans, Wayne Griffin, Tony Currie, [ren-Erich Zwicker, Joanne McLeish)
 2003 Directors Guild of Canada DGC Craft Award for Outstanding Achievement in Picture Editing - Long Form - Spider - Nominated
 2000 Genie Award for Best Achievement in Editing - eXistenZ - Won
 1998 (spring) Gemini Award for Best Picture Editing in a Dramatic Program or Series - Dead Silence - Nominated
 1996 Genie Award for Best Achievement in Editing - Crash - Won
 1991 Genie Award for Best Achievement in Film Editing - Perfectly Normal - Nominated
 1989 Genie Award for Best Achievement in Film Editing - Dead Ringers - Won
 1984 Genie Award for Best Achievement in Film Editing - Videodrome - Nominated
 1982 Genie Award for Best Achievement in Film Editing - Scanners - Nominated

See also
List of film director and editor collaborations

References

External links 
 

Canadian film editors
Canadian television producers
Best Editing Genie and Canadian Screen Award winners
Canadian television editors
Year of birth missing (living people)
Living people
Place of birth missing (living people)